Village of Four Seasons may refer to:
 Village of Four Seasons, Missouri
 Village of Four Seasons, Pennsylvania